Katherine Jerkovic is a Canadian film director. Her debut feature film, Roads in February (Les routes en février), won the Toronto International Film Festival Award for Best Canadian First Feature Film at the 2018 Toronto International Film Festival.

Of Croatian, Uruguayan and Argentine descent, Jerkovic grew up in Belgium and Uruguay before moving at age 18 to Montreal, where she studied film at Concordia University. She directed the short films Atlas sur l'aube in 2004 and The Winter's Keeper (Le gardien d'hiver) in 2010 before directing Roads in February.

The film was named to the Toronto International Film Festival's year-end Canada's Top Ten list for 2018, and Jerkovic won the Vancouver Film Critics Circle's "One to Watch" award at the Vancouver Film Critics Circle Awards 2018. She was also a nominee for Best Director and Best Screenplay. Her second narrative feature, titled Coyote, began shooting in fall 2021, and is slated to premiere at the 2022 Toronto International Film Festival.

References

External links

21st-century Canadian screenwriters
21st-century Canadian women writers
Canadian women film directors
Canadian women screenwriters
Concordia University alumni
Canadian screenwriters in French
Film directors from Montreal
Writers from Montreal
Canadian people of Croatian descent
Canadian people of Argentine descent
Canadian people of Uruguayan descent
Living people
Year of birth missing (living people)